The 1984 Girabola was the sixth season of top-tier football competition in Angola. Estrela Clube Primeiro de Maio were the defending champions.

The league comprised 14 teams, the bottom three of which were relegated.

Petro de Luanda were crowned champions, winning their 2nd title, while M.C.H. do Uíge, Nacional de Benguela and Progresso do Sambizanga were relegated.

Osvaldo Saturnino aka Jesus of Petro de Luanda finished as the top scorer with 22 goals.

Changes from the 1983 season
Relegated: Académica do Lobito, Andorinhas do Sumbe, Construtores de Malanje
Promoted: Ferroviário da Huíla, M.C.H. do Uíge, Sagrada Esperança

League table

Results

Season statistics

Most goals scored in a single match

Top scorers

External links
Federação Angolana de Futebol

Angola
Angola
Girabola seasons